Mark Allan Gardner (born March 1, 1962) is a former pitcher in Major League Baseball. He pitched for the Montreal Expos, Kansas City Royals, Florida Marlins and San Francisco Giants and also coached for the Giants.

Playing career
In his career, Gardner pitched in 345 games, posting a record of 99–93 and a 4.56 ERA. He appeared in 275 of his 345 career games as a starter. Gardner was also used as a long reliever and spot starter during the final years of his career. On July 26, 1991, Gardner no hit the Dodgers for nine innings but gave up two hits to start the bottom of the 10th (Jeff Fassero gave up the game-winning hit to Darryl Strawberry, the very next batter, but Gardner took the loss) and lost 1–0. Two nights later, his teammate Dennis Martinez threw a perfect game against the Dodgers.

On September 3, 1995, Gardner notched his only save in the major leagues. He pitched the bottom of the 11th for the Marlins to nail down an 8-7 victory over the Astros. 

Gardner played the last six seasons of his career with the Giants.  He shared the 2001 Willie Mac Award with Benito Santiago, which recognized each of their spirit and leadership.

Coaching career
He remained in the position until 2017 and was a member of three World Series championship teams.

Personal
Gardner attended Clovis High School in Clovis, California and California State University, Fresno, where he met his wife, Lori Gardner, an All-American softball pitcher. He and Lori have 2 sons. Lori Gardner struggled with liver cancer for several years during her husband's tenure with the Giants before dying from the disease in 2003. The Gardner family remains active in the Donate Life America organization.

References

External links

sfgiants.com profile

1962 births
Living people
American expatriate baseball players in Canada
Baseball coaches from California
Baseball players from Los Angeles
Brevard County Manatees players
Edmonton Trappers players
Florida Marlins players
Fresno City Rams baseball players
Fresno Grizzlies players
Fresno State Bulldogs baseball players
Indianapolis Indians players
Jacksonville Expos players
Jamestown Expos players
Kansas City Royals players
Major League Baseball bullpen coaches
Major League Baseball pitchers
Montreal Expos players
Omaha Royals players
San Francisco Giants coaches
San Francisco Giants players
San Jose Giants players
West Palm Beach Expos players
Anchorage Glacier Pilots players